Delmark Records is an American jazz and blues independent record label.  It was founded in 1958 and is based in Chicago, Illinois. The label originated in St. Louis, Missouri, in 1953 when then owner, and founder, Bob Koester released a recording of the Windy City Six, a traditional jazz group, under the Delmar imprint.

History
Born in 1932 in Wichita, Kansas, Bob Koester was the son of a petroleum engineer. While in the hospital with polio when he was a child, he listened to the radio and was cheered up when he heard Eddie Condon and Benny Goodman. In his teens, he was a dedicated jazz fan who began buying old records from a Salvation Army store. At concerts in Kansas City, he heard Red Allen, Count Basie, Jimmy Rushing, Tommy Douglas, Lionel Hampton, and Jay McShann.

Moving from Wichita to St. Louis  to attend college, Koester began his career as a record trader in his dormitory room. Joining a local jazz club gave Koester his first taste of live jazz, seeing Clark Terry perform. Koester made acquaintance with a fellow jazz club member, Ron Fister, with whom he opened his first record shop, K & F Sales. Shortly after opening in an old restaurant storefront, they changed the name to the Blue Note Record Shop. About a year after this joint venture, Fister and Koester decided to part ways, with Koester moving to the corner of Delmar and Olive streets in St. Louis. Taking the name from the street his shop was on, Koester recorded a local jazz group the Windy City Six in 1953. Shortly thereafter, Koester found local talent such as James Crutchfield, Speckled Red, J.D. Short, and Big Joe Williams.

Koester moved to Chicago in August 1958. He bought Seymour's Jazz Mart, and in renaming the storefront the Jazz Record Mart, Delmark Records found its new home in the basement of the record shop. By 1963, Koester had moved the shop to a location at 7 West Grand. During this period in Chicago, Delmark released albums by, Barney Bigard, Donald Byrd, Jimmy Forrest, George Lewis, Bud Powell, and Ira Sullivan.

Throughout the 1960s and 1970s, Delmark recorded the Art Ensemble of Chicago, Sonny Stitt, Junior Wells, Luther Allison, Arthur Crudup, Jimmy Dawkins, Sleepy John Estes, Buddy Guy, J. B. Hutto, Jimmy Johnson, Magic Sam, Robert Nighthawk, Yank Rachell, Otis Rush, Roosevelt Sykes, and Malachi Thompson.

In 1966, Chuck Nessa, manager of the Jazz Record Mart, convinced Koester to release albums by musicians associated with the Association for the Advancement of Creative Musicians. The first record was Roscoe Mitchell's Sound (1966) which received a five star review in Downbeat. This was followed by Muhal Richard Abrams' Levels and Degrees of Light (1968), Kalaparusha Maurice McIntyre's Humility in the Light of the Creator (1969) and Anthony Braxton's For Alto (1969). Delmark released two of the earliest Sun Ra albums, Sun Song and Sound of Joy, in 1967 and 1968 respectively.

Delmark has also released albums by Fred Anderson, Frank Catalano, Rob Mazurek, Nicole Mitchell, Ken Vandermark, Roy Campbell, Jr., and Ethnic Heritage Ensemble; and blues musicians including Zora Young, Ken Saydak, Byther Smith, Michael Coleman, Little Arthur Duncan, Eddie C. Campbell, Jimmy Burns, and ragtime musicians including Terry Waldo.

In March 2010, Delmark announced the release of the album Revisit by the Polish duo Mikrokolektyw. This album was Delmark's first by a European avant-garde jazz group in its 57-year history. In 2012, Delmark released two Chicago blues albums by Linsey Alexander and Mike Wheeler.

In May 2018, Koester retired and sold Delmark Records to Delmark Records LLC, of which Julia A. Miller is the Managing Member.  Julia A. Miller became the label President & CEO and Elbio Barilari became the Vice President & Artistic Director.  They are two musicians from Chicago and Uruguay, respectively.  The sale included Delmark's subsidiary labels, CD and LP inventory, the catalog of masters, and Riverside Studio.

Discography

Jazz
Delmark Records began releasing 12 inch LP jazz albums sporadically from 1959 commencing with the 400 series and continuing with the 500 series in 1998.

2000 Series
Delmark Records 2000 series consisted of eight CD releases between 2011 and 2012 when Delmark commenced the 5000 series.

5000 Series
Delmark Records 5000 series follows the 2000 series as the main series of Delmark jazz albums from 2012 onwards.

Blues
Delmark Records began releasing 12 inch LP blues albums in 1961 with the 600 series which continued through the 800s by 2008.

See also
 List of record labels

References

External links

 
 Tail Dragger interview with Artist Connection Podcast

American independent record labels
Blues record labels
Jazz record labels
Record labels established in 1953